Picas is free art photo editing application which uses deep neural network and artificial intelligence to automatically redraw photos to artistic effects.

The app was created by Picas.Inc, a subsidiary of IObit. It was first launched in September 2016 for Android and few weeks later, the app was featured on Google Play Store as editor's choice. On 12 September 2016, the developer launched a version of the app for iOS.

On 24 October 2016, the developer announced that the online photo editing is available on Picas official website.

History 
The app was created by Picas.Inc, a subsidiary of IObit, focusing on picture artwork and picture privacy protection. IObit, founded in 2004, provides consumers with innovative system utilities for Windows, Mac, and Android OS to greatly enhance their performance and protect them from security threats. With over 100 awards, 250 million downloads and 10 million active users worldwide, IObit is a well-recognized industry leader.

Features 
Users can take or choose a picture and select different filters to turn the picture into art effects. At launch, the app offered 45 filters, with new filters added each week. The app transforms pictures into artistic effects with the help of artificial intelligence and deep neural network algorithm on their server, and no photos will be saved as the developer stated. On 24 October 2016, the developer announced that the app is supports online photo editing.

References

External links 
 Official website

Android (operating system) software
IOS software
Deep learning software applications
Photo software
Web applications